Conesa can refer to:

 Marcos Mateo Conesa, Spanish military person
 Conesa, Buenos Aires, town in San Nicolás Partido, Buenos Aires Province, Argentina
 General Conesa, Buenos Aires, town in Tordillo, Buenos Aires Province, Argentina
 Conesa Department, Río Negro, Argentina
 General Conesa, Río Negro, capital of Conesa Department
 Conesa, Tarragona, municipality in Cuenca de Barberá, Tarragona, Spain